Kazan National Research Technological University, KNRTU is an innovational scientific educational complex. The University comprises 15 academic and research institutes; runs over 100 Specialist, Bachelor's, Master's Degree and Ph.D. programs; enrolls over 27,000 undergraduate and graduate students, 900 Ph.D. and 100 Post-Doc students from Russia and other countries; employs over 300 Full Professors, Doctors of Science and 800 Associate Professors, Ph.D.s; raises the budget of 1.4 billion rubles.

The partner institutions of Kazan National Research Technological University are 24 universities, research centers and international educational organizations in 13 countries. The University is one of the 6 Russian Universities which are members of Eurasia Pacific University Network (UNINET).

History 

The University derived from Kazan United industrial college opened in 1897. In 1919, it was transformed to Kazan Polytechnical Institute and in 1930 Kazan Chemical-Technological Institute (KCTI named after S.M. Kirov) was created on the basis of Polytechnical Institute and Chemical Faculty of Kazan State University.
In 1992, KCTI was renamed to Kazan State Technological University (KSTU).
In 2010, the University acquired the status of national research institute and was given its present name.

Institutes 

The University comprises 13 academic and research institutes; runs over 100 Specialist, Bachelor's, Master's Degree and Ph.D. programs; enrolls over 27 thousand undergraduate and graduate students, 900 Ph.D. and 100 Post-Doc students from Russia and other countries; and employs over 300 Full Professors, Doctors of Science and 800 Associate Professors, Ph.D.s.

Institutes are structural academic and research subdivisions of Kazan State Technological University. Institutes consist of faculties, which, in their turn, include academic departments.

Academic Institutes
 Institute of Chemical Engineering and Technology 
 Institute of Petroleum, Chemistry and Nanotechnologies 
 Institute of Mechanical Engineering for Chemical and Petrochemical Industry 
 Institute of Polymers 
 Institute of Light Industry, Fashion and Design 
 Institute of Automated Control Systems and Information Technologies 
 Institute of Administration, Economics and Social Technologies 
 Institute of Food Engineering and Biotechnology 
 Institute of Military Education 
 Institute of Additional Professional Education 
 Institute of Lifelong Education 
 Corporate University

Research and design institutes
 Design Institute “Soyuzhimpromprojekt”
 Research Institute “Speckauchuk”

References

External links
 English language and Russian language Kazan State Technological University official website  and 

Universities in Kazan
National research universities in Russia
Technical universities and colleges in Russia
Educational institutions established in 1890
1890 establishments in the Russian Empire